is a subway station on the Sendai Subway Tōzai Line in Aoba-ku, Sendai, Japan, operated by the municipal subway operator Sendai City Transportation Bureau.

Lines
The station is numbered "T03".

Station layout
The station has one island platform serving two tracks on the third basement ("B3F") level. The ticket barriers are located on the second basement ("B2F") level.

Platforms

Gallery

Staffing
The station is staffed and operated by sub-contracted employees from the security company Alsok.

History
The station opened on 6 December 2015, coinciding with the opening of the Tōzai Line.

Passenger statistics
In fiscal 2015, the station was used by an average of 2,533 passengers daily.

Surrounding area
 Tohoku University Kawauchi Campus
 The Miyagi Museum of Art
 Sendai No. 2 High School

See also
 List of railway stations in Japan
 Kawauchi Station (Iwate), a similarly named station on the Yamada Line in Iwate Prefecture

References

External links

  

Sendai Subway Tozai Line
Railway stations in Miyagi Prefecture
Railway stations in Japan opened in 2015